Behold the Sun, Op. 44, is an opera in three acts and 10 scenes by Alexander Goehr with a libretto by John McGrath and the composer. It was commissioned for the 25th anniversary of the Deutsche Oper am Rhein. Titled Behold the Sun – Die Wiedertäufer, it was premiered there in German in 1985, and published by Schott Music. It was aired in English by the BBC in 1987. The opera has also been called Die Wiedertäufer and The Anabaptists.

History 
The opera was commissioned for the 25th anniversary of the Deutsche Oper am Rhein in Düsseldorf and Duisburg. The libretto by John McGrath and Goehr is focused on the Wiedertäufer (anabaptists) and set in Münster in 1543, when two Dutch anabaptists, Jan Matthys and John of Leiden (or Jan Bokelson) tried to transform the town to a "City of God" in expectation of the Second Coming of Christ. The libretto was translated to German by Bernhard Laux.

Goehr, who was born in Berlin but grew up and worked in England, worked on the composition between 1981 and 1984. Titled Behold the Sun – Die Wiedertäufer, the opera was premiered in Duisburg on 19 April 1985, conducted by Hiroshi Wakasugi, and staged by Bohumil Herlischka in a set designed by Ruodi Barth. It was played in an abridged version, which cut about 50 minutes of Goehr's score.

The opera was first presented in English by the BBC, aired on 1 October 1987. This time, the complete music was played, conducted by John Pritchard. It was published by Schott Music.

An aria from the opera, Op. 44a, was recorded as part of a collection of the composer's works, with soprano Jeanine Thames and the London Sinfonietta, conducted by Oliver Knussen.

Roles

Music 
Goehr said about his opera that the people are the protagonists, and the focus of the music is their turbae chorus sections. He combined 20th-century harmonies with baroque features such as figured bass and prelude and fugue.

References

External links 
 Cambridge Cultural History of Britain: Volume 9, Modern Britain

Operas by Alexander Goehr
Operas
1985 operas
German-language operas
English-language operas
Operas set in the 16th century
Operas set in Germany